California's 16th State Senate district is one of 40 California State Senate districts. It is currently represented by Republican Shannon Grove of Bakersfield.

District profile 
The district consists of portions of the southeastern Central Valley, as well as the High Desert and the intervening mountains. Most of the population is in the Central Valley portions, while the desert regions in the east of the district are fairly sparsely populated.

Kern County – 65.7%
 Bakersfield – 80.6%
 California City
 Maricopa
 Ridgecrest
 Taft
 Tehachapi

San Bernardino County – 7.3%
 Barstow
 Landers
 Needles
 Twentynine Palms
 Yucca Valley

Tulare County – 50.0%
 Exeter
 Tulare
 Visalia

Election results from statewide races

List of senators 
Due to redistricting, the 16th district has been moved around different parts of the state. The current iteration resulted from the 2011 redistricting by the California Citizens Redistricting Commission.

Election results 1994 - present

2018

2014

2013 (special)

2010

2006

2002

1998

1994

See also 
 California State Senate
 California State Senate districts
 Districts in California

References

External links 
 California's 16th State Senate district map — from the California Citizens Redistricting Commission.

16
Government of Kern County, California
Government of San Bernardino County, California
Government of Tulare County, California
Government of Bakersfield, California
Mojave Desert
San Joaquin Valley
Searles Valley
Tehachapi Mountains
Mojave National Preserve
Barstow, California
Needles, California
Ridgecrest, California
Twentynine Palms, California
Yucca Valley, California
Visalia, California